The Fuling gas field is a natural gas field located in Chongqing. It was discovered in 2014 and developed by Sinopec. It began production in 2014 and produces natural gas and condensates. The total proven reserves of the Fuling gas field are around 74 trillion cubic feet (2100 km³), and production is slated to be around 970 million cubic feet/day (28×105m³).

References

Natural gas fields in China